Peyrat-le-Château is a commune in the Haute-Vienne department in the Nouvelle-Aquitaine region in west-central France.

Inhabitants are known as Peyratois or Castel Peyratois in French.

Notable people
Gilles Lalay (1962–1992), motorcycle enduro and rally raid competitor

See also
Communes of the Haute-Vienne department

External links 
 tourism

References

Communes of Haute-Vienne
County of La Marche